The Army of the Midi (Armée du Midi) was a unit of the French army, stationed in the Midi region and created by royal decree of Louis XVI on 13 April 1792. The first leader of the army was Jacques Bernard d'Anselme.

References 

1792 establishments in France
Midi
Military units and formations established in 1792
Military units and formations of the Peninsular War